Ruselli Hartawan (born 27 December 1997) is an Indonesian badminton player. She is the member of Jaya Raya Jakarta badminton club, and selected to join the national team in 2013. She competed in the girls' singles badminton at the 2014 Summer Youth Olympics in Nanjing, China, but she was stopped in the quarter-finals after being defeated by Akane Yamaguchi of Japan. In 2017, she won the women's singles title at the national championships in Pangkal Pinang.

Awards and nominations

Achievements

Southeast Asian Games 
Women's singles

BWF Grand Prix (1 runner-up) 
The BWF Grand Prix had two levels, the Grand Prix and Grand Prix Gold. It was a series of badminton tournaments sanctioned by the Badminton World Federation (BWF) and played between 2007 and 2017.

Women's singles

 BWF Grand Prix tournament
 BWF Grand Prix Gold tournament

BWF International Challenge/Series (2 titles, 3 runners-up) 

Women's singles

 BWF International Challenge tournament
 BWF International Series tournament

BWF Junior International (2 titles)
Girls' doubles

Mixed doubles

  BWF Junior International Grand Prix tournament
  BWF Junior International Challenge tournament
  BWF Junior International Series tournament
  BWF Junior Future Series tournament

Performance timeline 
Performance timeline

National team 
 Junior level

 Senior level

Individual competitions

Women's singles 
 Junior level

 Senior level

Women's doubles

Record against selected opponents 
Record against World Superseries finalists, World Championships semifinalists, and Olympic quarterfinalists, as well as all Olympic opponents.

  He Bingjiao 0–4
  Li Xuerui 1–2
  Sun Yu 0–1
  Yao Xue 0–1
  Lindaweni Fanetri 0–1
  Akane Yamaguchi 0–3
  Yui Hashimoto 0–1
  Zhang Beiwen 1–2
  Sung Ji-hyun 0–2
  An Se-young 1–2

References

External links

1997 births
Living people
Sportspeople from Jakarta
Indonesian female badminton players
Badminton players at the 2014 Summer Youth Olympics
Badminton players at the 2018 Asian Games
Asian Games bronze medalists for Indonesia
Asian Games medalists in badminton
Medalists at the 2018 Asian Games
Competitors at the 2019 Southeast Asian Games
Southeast Asian Games silver medalists for Indonesia
Southeast Asian Games medalists in badminton
21st-century Indonesian women